A mahant is a religious superior in Hindu religious establishments or groups. It is a title (surname) of Bairagi.

Mahant  or Mahanta may also refer to:
 Mahanta (moth)
 Mahanta quadrilinea
 Mahant, a ruler of the princely state Chhuikhadan State
 Mahant, a ruler of the princely state Nandgaon State
 Mahant Balaknath
 Mahant Shreyonath
 Mahant Lachhman Dass High School
 Mahanta Mohanananda Brahmachari

People with the given name
 Mahant Avaidyanath (1921–2014), Indian politician and Hindu preacher
 Mahant Chandnath (1956–2017), Indian politician and religious leader
 Mahant Swami Maharaj (born 1933), Indian Hindu religious leader
 Vaishnavi Mahant (born 1974), Indian actress

People with the surname
 Adikanda Mahanta (born 1954), Indian folklorist
 Angarag Mahanta, Indian singer, known by his stage name Papon
 Charan Das Mahant (born 1954), Indian politician
 Heerak Jyoti Mahanta (died 1991), Indian Assamese separatist
 Joyasree Goswami Mahanta (born 1960), Indian politician
 Keshab Mahanta (born 1959), Indian politician
 Khagen Mahanta (19442–2014), Indian singer
 Mitradev Mahanta (1894–1983), Indian writer, dramatist, historical researcher, freedom fighter, and actor
 Prafulla Kumar Mahanta, Indian politician
 Urmila Mahanta, Indian actress

See also
 Mahaanta, Indian film